This is a list of science centers (spelt science centre in Commonwealth English) organized by continent. Science centers are a type of science museum that emphasizes an interactive, hands-on approach with its exhibitions.

Africa

Americas

Asia

Europe

Oceania

References